Jessica Bell may refer to:

 Jessica Bell (author) (born 1981), Australian singer-songwriter, publisher, author, graphic designer
 Jessica Bell (politician), Canadian politician